Aeronautical Accidents Investigation and Prevention Center (CENIPA)  is a unit of the Brazilian Air Force that investigates aviation accidents and incidents in Brazil. It is headquartered in Brasília. Per their website, the CENIPA was "established on June 7, 1982," to "discuss, at a national level, solutions to problems related to flight"

See also

 Gol Transportes Aéreos Flight 1907
 TAM Airlines Flight 3054
 2009 Manaus Aerotáxi crash
 Noar Linhas Aéreas Flight 4896

References

External links
 Aeronautical Accidents Investigation and Prevention Center
 Aeronautical Accidents Investigation and Prevention Center 

Government agencies of Brazil
Aviation organisations based in Brazil
Brazil